Ryan Jiro Gravenberch (born 16 May 2002) is a Dutch professional footballer who plays as a midfielder for Bundesliga club Bayern Munich and the Netherlands national team.

Club career

Ajax
Gravenberch joined the Ajax Youth Academy in 2010, and worked his way up through the junior levels. On 7 June 2018, he received the first ever "Abdelhak Nouri Trofee", which recognizes the best talent in the Ajax academy. He signed his first professional contract with Ajax that same day, keeping him at the club until 2023. Gravenberch made his professional debut with Jong Ajax in a 5–2 Eerste Divisie win over FC Dordrecht on 24 August 2018.

Gravenberch made his senior debut with Ajax on 23 September 2018, in a 3–0 Eredivisie loss to PSV. Gravenberch became the youngest ever Ajax player to play in the Eredivisie at 16 years and 130 days, surpassing the record of 16 years and 242 days set by Clarence Seedorf.

On 25 November 2020, Gravenberch scored his first Champions League goal in a 3–1 win over Midtjylland in the 2020–21 season.

On 18 April 2021, Gravenberch scored the first goal in a 2–1 win over Vitesse in the 2021 KNVB Cup Final.

Bayern Munich 
On 13 June 2022, Gravenberch signed for Bundesliga club Bayern Munich on a five-year contract. The transfer fee paid to Ajax was a reported €18 million, with an additional €5 million in variables. On 31 August 2022, he scored his first goal and provided an assist in a 5–0 win over Viktoria Köln in the DFB-Pokal.

International career
Gravenberch is a youth international for the Netherlands. At the age of 16, he represented the Netherlands U19s in a friendly 4–1 loss to the England U19s on 5 September 2018.

He was called up to the senior Netherlands squad in November 2020. He made his debut on 24 March 2021 in a World Cup qualifier against Turkey. On 6 June 2021, Gravenberch scored in an international friendly game against Georgia where the Netherlands won 3–0.

Personal life
Gravenberch was born in the Netherlands and is of Surinamese descent. Gravenberch's older brother, Danzell Gravenberch, is also a professional footballer.

Career statistics

Club

International

As of match played 6 June 2021. Netherlands score listed first, score column indicates score after each Gravenberch goal.

Honours
Ajax
 Eredivisie: 2018–19, 2020–21, 2021–22
 KNVB Cup: 2018–19, 2020–21

Bayern Munich
 DFL-Supercup: 2022

Netherlands U17
 UEFA European Under-17 Championship: 2018

Individual
 Eredivisie Talent of the Year: 2020–21
 Ajax Talent of the Future (Abdelhak Nouri Award): 2018
 Ajax Talent of the Year (Marco van Basten Award): 2021
 Johan Cruyff Trophy: 2020–21
 Eredivisie Player of the Month: March 2021
Eredivisie Talent of the Month: March 2022

References

External links

 Profile at the FC Bayern Munich website
 
 Career stats - Voetbal International
 UEFA Youth League Profile
 Ons Oranje U16 Profile
 Ons Oranje U17 Profile
 Ons Oranje U19 Profile

2002 births
Living people
Footballers from Amsterdam
Dutch footballers
Association football midfielders
AFC Ajax players
Jong Ajax players
FC Bayern Munich footballers
Eredivisie players
Eerste Divisie players
Bundesliga players
Netherlands youth international footballers
Netherlands under-21 international footballers
Netherlands international footballers
UEFA Euro 2020 players
Dutch expatriate footballers
Expatriate footballers in Germany
Dutch expatriate sportspeople in Germany
Dutch sportspeople of Surinamese descent